Damir Kalapač (born 18 August 1963) is a Croatian retired footballer who played as a defender and made one appearance for the Croatia national team.

International career
Kalapač earned his first and only cap for Croatia on 19 June 1991 in a friendly match against a Slovenia selection. He came on as an 80th-minute substitute for Mladen Mladenović in the away match, which was played in Murska Sobota and finished as a 1–0 win.

Career statistics

International

References

External links
 
 

1963 births
Living people
Sportspeople from Zadar
Association football defenders
Yugoslav footballers
Croatian footballers
Croatia international footballers
NK Zadar players
TSV 1860 Munich players
NK Zagreb players
HNK Segesta players
DSV Leoben players
Yugoslav Second League players
Oberliga (football) players
Croatian Football League players
2. Liga (Austria) players
Yugoslav expatriate footballers
Expatriate footballers in West Germany
Yugoslav expatriate sportspeople in West Germany
Croatian expatriate footballers
Expatriate footballers in Austria
Croatian expatriate sportspeople in Austria